Tüp is a district of Issyk-Kul Region in north-eastern Kyrgyzstan. The seat lies at Tüp. It borders Issyk-Kul District to the west, Ak-Suu District to the east and south-east, Kazakhstan to the north, and Issyk Kul to the south.

Geography
The district is located between Küngöy Ala-Too Range and Issyk-Kul lake. The topography varies from multiple-folded medium-altitude mountains featuring in erosional dissection to alluvial - proluvial planes with river fans, and lakeside planes of Issyk-Kul lake area. Approximately 48% of the district is occupied by mountains, and 48% - by valleys. The hydrological conditions are dominated by Tüp river that rises on north slopes of Teskey Ala-Too Range.

Climate
An average temperature in January is -6°C in valleys, and -14°C in mountains. In July, an average temperature varies from +18°C in valleys, to +9°C in mountains. An absolute recorded temperature maximum is +35°. Average maximum temperatures are +30°C in valleys, and +15°C in mountains. Average yearly precipitation is 350-400 mm in valleys, and 500-600 mm in mountains. An average snow cover is up to 30 cm. The Eastern wind called Santash reaches 20-30 m/s.

Population

Populated places
In total, Tüp District includes 37 settlements in 13 rural communities. Each rural community may include one or several villages. The rural communities and settlements in the Tüp District are:

 Ak-Bulak (seat: Ak-Bulak)
 Ak-Bulung (seat: Ak-Bulung; incl. Belovodskoye and Frunzenskoye)
 Aral (seat: Ming-Bulak; incl. Aral, Dolon, Kosh-Döbö and Sary-Döbö)
 Chong-Tash (seat: Chong-Tash; incl. Jyluu-Bulak)
 Karasaev (seat: Tasma; incl. Toktoyan and Chong-Toguz-Bay)
 Kuturgu (seat: Kuturgu; incl. Kichi-Örüktü, Oy-Bulak and Oy-Tal)
 Mikhaylovka (seat: Mikhaylovka)
 San-Tash (seat: Bayzak; incl. Karkyra, Keng-Suu, San-Tash and Sary-Tologoy)
 Sary-Bulak (seat: Balbay; incl. Kürmöntü)
 Taldy-Suu (seat: Taldy-Suu; incl. Ichke-Suu, Kööchü and Korumdu)
 Toguz-Bulak (seat: Toguz-Bulak; incl. Sary-Bulung)
 Tüp (seat: Tüp; incl. Birlik and Shaty)
 Ysyk-Köl (seat - village: Ysyk-Köl; incl. Yntymak)

References 

Districts of Issyk-Kul Region